= Abdullah Nur Kaskai =

- Location within Pakistan
- Coordinates: 32.42°N 70.01°E
- Country: Pakistan
- Territory: Federally Administered Tribal Areas
- Elevation: 1,128 m (3,701 ft)
- Time zone: UTC+5 (PST)
  - Summer (DST): UTC+6 (PDT)

Abdullah Nur Kaskai is a town in the Federally Administered Tribal Areas of Pakistan. It is located at 32°25'23N 70°0'19E with an altitude of 1128 metres (3704 feet).
